Ironshore Inc. provides broker-sourced specialty property and casualty insurance coverages for varying risks on a global basis through its platforms in Australia, Bermuda, Canada, Ireland, Singapore, the United States and the United Kingdom. On December 5, 2016, it was announced that Ironshore will be sold to Liberty Mutual in a $3 billion transaction.

History 

The company was founded in 2006, with more than $1 billion in equity, by Robert Clements and his son John Clements, two long-time insurance investors.

Ironshore named Kevin Kelley as CEO in December 2008. Kelley had been the longtime CEO of Lexington Insurance, which became the largest excess and surplus lines insurer in the world under his leadership. Shaun Kelly resigned as president and Chief Operating Officer of Lexington and was appointed chief executive officer of U.S. Operations for Ironshore. During 2015, Ironshore acquired Dubai-based MGA, Visionary underwriting Agency Ltd, a Lloyd's Coverholders founded in 2010 by David Austin.

Operations 

The company's product lines include Aviation, Environmental, IronBuilt, IronHealth, IronPro, Marine Re, Personal Lines, Political Risk, Ironshore Programs, and U.S. Property and Specialty Casualty.

The Ironshore group of companies is rated A (Excellent) by A.M. Best with a Financial Size Category of XIV. Ironshore’s Pembroke Syndicate 4000 operates within Lloyd’s with a market rating of A (Excellent) from A.M. Best and A+ from both Standard and Poor’s and Fitch Group. A.M. Best announced in 2012 a revised rating outlook to "Positive" for Ironshore and its subsidiaries.

On  29 June 2020, Ironshore Pharmaceuticals Inc. ('Ironshore'), a wholly owned affiliate of Highland Therapeutics Inc., confirmed the publication in the Field of Clinical Psychopharmacology of an original paper outlining a concept that could promote the dose optimisation of JORNAY PM® (methylphenidate HCl) extended-release capsules CII. In August 2018 the US Food and Drug Administration (FDA) licensed JORNAY PM to treat ADHD in children 6 years of age and older.

References

External links 
 

Insurance companies of the United States
Financial services companies established in 2006
2016 mergers and acquisitions
Liberty Mutual